The Charing Cross Theatre is a theatre under The Arches off Villiers Street below Charing Cross station. Founded in 1936, the venue occupied several premises in the West End of London before locating to its present site. The current site was once a famous Victorian music hall The Players' Theatre. It was refurbished in 2005 and reopened under new management in 2006 as The New Players Theatre, before being taken under new management by Broadway producer Steven M. Levy and Sean Sweeney in 2011 and the theatre once again had its name changed to the Charing Cross Theatre, with the Players Bar & Kitchen.

It is one of the smallest West End Theatres, rebuilt to meet the demands of national and international producers wanting a theatre which offers a degree of intimacy and is the equivalent of an Off Broadway space.

With the appointment of Thom Southerland as Artistic Director in 2016, Charing Cross Theatre announced it was turning into a producing house launching with a number of major musicals.

Productions

Recent

 Allegiance - 7th January 2023 - 8th April 2023
 From Here To Eternity – 29 October 2022 - 17 December 2022
 Zorro: The Musical – 2 April 2022 - 28 May 2022
 Divine/Simply Divine – UK professional premiere, October 2019
 Amour – UK professional premiere, May - June 2019
 Violet – UK professional premiere, January - April 2019
 The Woman In White – 1st London revival, November 2017 - February 2018
 The Knowledge – 4-11 September 2017
 Death Takes a Holiday – 3 December 2016 – 21 January 2017
 Ragtime – 8 October – 10 December 2016
 Titanic – 28 May – 6 August 2016 (Return of Southwark Playhouse production)
 Piaf Play – Dec 2015 - Jan 2016
 Dusty – 2015
 Truth, Lies Diana – 2014
 Grim – August 2014
 Ushers: The Front of House Musical – March to June 2014
 Finian's Rainbow – April to May 2014
 Lost Boy (play) Phil Willmott
 A Christmas Carol
 Wag The Musical
 Dear World
 Naked Boys Singing
 La bohème
 Keeler

References

External links 

Theatres in the City of Westminster